The 2016 Bangabandhu Cup or 2016 Bangabandhu Gold Cup was an international association football tournament organised by the Bangladesh Football Federation as a tribute to Father of the Nation Bangabandhu Sheikh Mujibur Rahman. Launched in 1996, it was the 4th time the tournament had been held. Eight teams from the Asian Football Confederation participated in this edition.

Format
In the group stage, six teams were divided into two groups of three teams, playing a single round-robin, with the teams finishing first and second in each group qualifying to the semi-finals.

Prize money
Winner: ৳4,250,000.
Runner-up: ৳2,000,000.

Referees
Sivakorn Pu-Udon (Thailand)
Mohmed Jalal Vddin (BAN)
Bhubon Tarafder (BAN)
Hien Triet Nguyen (Vietnam)
Omar Al-Yacobi (Oman)
Pranjal Banerjee (India)

Broadcasters
 Channel 9
 Bangladesh Television-BTV

Participating nations
The following nations have entered the competition:

Venues
Fifteen matches were played at two different venues in Dhaka and Jessore: The Bangabandhu National Stadium in Dhaka,  and Shamsul Huda Stadium in Jessore.

Group stage

Group A

Group B

Knockout stage

Bracket

Semi-finals

Final

This was the first win by Nepal in any tournament in 23 years. Striker Bimal Gharti Magar won the Man Of The Match for his goal and assist.

Awards

Goalscorers
4 Goals
 Nawayug Shrestha

2 Goals

 Bimal Gharti Magar 
 Bishal Rai 
 Rony
 Naaiz Hassan
 Ismail Easa
 Chaturanga
 Tith Dina
 Ahmed Imaz

References

2016
2016 in Bangladeshi football
Bangabandhu Cup
2016 in Cambodian football
2016 in Malaysian football
2016 in Maldivian football
2016 in Nepalese sport
2016 in Sri Lankan sport
International association football competitions hosted by Bangladesh
January 2016 sports events in Asia